"Sh-Boom (Life Could Be a Dream)" is an early doo-wop song by the R&B vocal group The Chords. It was written by James Keyes, Claude Feaster, Carl Feaster, Floyd F. McRae, and William Edwards, members of The Chords, and published in 1954. It is sometimes considered the first doo-wop or rock 'n' roll record to reach the top ten on the pop charts (as opposed to the R&B charts), as it was a top-10 hit that year for both the Chords (who first recorded the song) and The Crew-Cuts. In 2004, it was ranked No. 215 on Rolling Stone's "Top 500 Best Songs of All Time".

History
The song was written and first recorded on Atlantic Records' subsidiary label Cat Records by the R&B group the Chords on March 15, 1954, and would be their only hit song. The group reportedly auditioned the song for famed record producer Bobby Robinson while he was sick in bed, but he rejected them, stating the song "wasn't commercial enough". When the Chords recorded their debut single for Cat Records, a cover of Patti Page's "Cross Over the Bridge", the label reluctantly allowed them to record "Sh-Boom" for the B-side with Sam "The Man" Taylor on saxophone. "Sh-Boom" would eventually overshadow "Cross Over the Bridge", reaching No. 2 on the Billboard R&B charts and peaking at No. 9 on the pop charts. It was later released by Cat as an A-side, coupled with another Chords original, "Little Maiden".

A more traditional version was made by an all-white Canadian group, the Crew-Cuts (with the David Carroll Orchestra), for Mercury Records and was No. 1 on the Billboard charts for nine weeks during August and September 1954. The single first entered the charts on July 30, 1954, and stayed for 20 weeks. The Crew-Cuts performed the song on Ed Sullivan's Toast of the Town on December 12, 1954. On the Cash Box magazine best-selling record charts, where both versions were combined, the song reached No. 1.

Other recordings
Stan Freberg recorded a combined spoof of "Sh-Boom" and Marlon Brando because he felt that they both mumbled, in 1954.  It reached No. 14 in the US and 15 in the UK.  The Billy Williams Quartet released a version in 1954 on Coral Records that reached No. 21 on the Billboard Hot 100, with orchestra directed by Jack Pleis. A recording by Ken Mackintosh and His Orchestra (vocalists: the Mackpies) was made in London on April 7, 1954. It was released by EMI on the His Master's Voice label as catalog number B 10698.

The record for most recordings of "Sh-Boom" by a single group probably belongs to the Harvard Din & Tonics, a co-ed a cappella  singing group that has featured the song on 12 of their 13 albums. Their 1979 Crew-Cuts-style arrangement was so popular that the group began performing "Sh-Boom" as their signature song at all their concerts, bringing all their alumni onstage to perform it across the United States and through 10 world tours.

The British Doo-Wop revivalists, Darts, recorded "Sh-Boom" in the late 1970s, this time at a slower tempo. It was released as the B-side of the band's last charting single, reaching No. 48 in the UK charts in 1980.

The reggae crooner Alton Ellis recorded a cover entitled "She Boom" for Studio One some time in the 1970s; the EP has been pressed at various times by various distributors.

In the 1980s a parody of the song entitled "Dubuque" was featured in the Dubuque ham TV commercial, a midwestern-based meat packing company.

German rock-and-roll band Spider Murphy Gang adapted the song into a Bavarian version, "Leben is wiar a Traum", which they released as a single in 1985.

The Fleetwoods released a cover version of the song. Canadian children's entertainers Sharon, Lois & Bram covered the song on their 1995 album release titled Let's Dance!. Watkin Tudor Jones covered the song on his 2001 album, Memoirs Of A Clone. British doo-wop act the Overtones covered the song on their 2010 album Good Ol' Fashioned Love. The song was covered in 1955 by Enoch Light And His Light Brigade Orchestra, released in the UK on His Master's Voice, and appears on their album Little Things Mean A Lot from Jasmine Records.

In popular culture
Alternative recordings based on the Crew Cuts' recording were heard in the TV series Happy Days (1974–84) and in the film Clue (1985). The original Chords' recording was featured in The Super (1991), The Sum of Us (1994), Cry-Baby featuring Johnny Depp (1990), Two of Us (2000), Road House (1989), and the mini-series Lipstick on Your Collar (1993).  The song can also be heard at the end credits of the film A Simple Wish (1997).  The Trevor Horn Orchestra covered the song for the Mona Lisa Smile (2003) soundtrack. Pixar's Cars used a long recording of the original song (2006), and Disney California Adventure prominently incorporated it into the nightly neon lighting ceremony in the new Cars Land. The song is briefly featured in a Nexgard Chewables for Dogs commercial. The song was featured in a scene in Dolphin Tale (2011). 

A remixed version of the Crew Cuts cover by Junkie XL is featured during the end credits of the video game Destroy All Humans!. New York television personality Clay Cole wrote about the early years of rock 'n' roll and live television in his memoirs, Sh-Boom! The Explosion of Rock 'n' Roll (1953–1968), published by Morgan James Books. "Sh-Boom" was parodied by Stan Freberg. Another parody, as a singing Lucky Strike cigarette commercial by the Sportsmen Quartet, appeared on the October 31, 1954, Jack Benny radio show. Comic Ronnie Golden wrote a parody, "Shoe Bomb," on the subject of the British terrorist Richard Reid. The Crew Cuts version of the song appeared in the video game Mafia II (2010).

The Crew Cuts version was heard in the game show Trapped! in the challenge Wicked Wardrobes.

The Chords’ version is also featured in HBO’s Lovecraft Country (2020) and in the psychological thriller film Don't Worry Darling (2022) at the poolside scene and in the end credits.

Voiceplay released a cover of their version on August 30, 2019.

The song was in a meme that went viral, which showed footage of a CGI gorilla swimming underwater in a Donkey Kong Country commercial from 2003.  It was also put to video of a chimpanzee being held by its hands and being swung around.

Notes

References

External links
 A History Of Rock Music in Five Hundred Songs, episode 18: “Sh-Boom” by the Chords

1954 singles
The Crew-Cuts songs
Doo-wop songs
The Fleetwoods songs
Mercury Records singles
Number-one singles in the United States